was an ice hockey player from Japan. She competed for her country in ice hockey at the 1998 Winter Olympics. She also played for Laval Le Mistral a women's ice hockey team in the National Women's Hockey League during the 1999–2000 NWHL season. Her sister Masako Sato also played for Laval Le Mistral.

Stats
Japan National Team

Laval Le Mistral (NWHL)

References

1973 births
Living people
Ice hockey players at the 1998 Winter Olympics
People from Tomakomai, Hokkaido
Japanese women's ice hockey defencemen
Olympic ice hockey players of Japan
Asian Games silver medalists for Japan
Ice hockey players at the 1999 Asian Winter Games
Medalists at the 1999 Asian Winter Games
Asian Games medalists in ice hockey